Didier Vermeersch (born 6 January 1953) is a Belgian rower. He competed in the men's double sculls event at the 1976 Summer Olympics.

References

External links
 

1953 births
Living people
Belgian male rowers
Olympic rowers of Belgium
Rowers at the 1976 Summer Olympics
Place of birth missing (living people)